The French ironclad Gloire ("Glory") was the first ocean-going ironclad, launched in 1859. It was developed after the Crimean War, in response to new developments of naval gun technology, especially the Paixhans guns and rifled guns, which used explosive shells with increased destructive power against wooden ships, and after the development of the ironclad floating batteries built by the British and French for the bombardment of Russian forts during the Crimean War.

Design and description 
Gloire was designed by the French naval architect Henri Dupuy de Lôme as a 5,630-ton broadside ironclad with a wooden hull. Its 12 cm-thick (4.7 in) armour plates, backed with 43 cm (17 in) of timber, resisted hits by the experimental shooting of the strongest guns of the time (the French 50-pounder and the British 68-pounder) at full charge, at a distance of 20 metres (65 ft).

Her maximum speed was 13.1 knots but other reports suggested no more than 11.75 knots had been attained and that 11 knots was the practical maximum.

As was common for the era, Gloire was constructed with sails as well as a steam-powered screw.  The original rigging was a light barquentine rig providing 1,096 sq. m (11,800 sq. ft) of surface area.  This was later increased to a full rig providing 2,508 sq. m (27,000 sq. ft) of surface.

Service 

Gloire was launched at the arsenal of Mourillon, Toulon, on 24 November 1859; and entered service in August 1860.

It was eliminated from the French fleet registry in 1879, and scrapped in 1883.

Importance in naval history 
As the first ocean-going ironclad, Gloire rendered obsolete traditional unarmoured wooden ships-of-the-line, and all major navies soon began to build ironclads of their own.

Gallery

Notes

Bibliography

 
 

 

Ships built in France
1859 ships
Gloire-class ironclads